Textile Engineering College, Chittagong is a college in Bangladesh, offering bachelor's degree in textile engineering. It is situated by the side of old Dhaka Trunk road which passes through Zorargonj, Mirsharai, Chittagong. It is one of the seven constituent textile engineering colleges of Bangladesh University of Textiles, which are collectively funded by the Department of Textiles.

History
The college was established in 1911 and moved to its current location in 1960. A three-year textile engineering course was set up in 1994 which was superseded by a four-year Bachelor of Science course in textile engineering in the 2006-2007 session. It was declared as a college on 13 January 2006.
 
The college provides textile education. The Textile Engineering College operates under the administrative control of the Department of Textiles of the Ministry of Textiles and Jute.
 
It was established in 1911 as a weaving school, which was the result of "Shwodeshi Andolon" during the British regime. It was transferred to the entry point of Mohuri Project Road in 1960. In 1980, the courses of the weaving school were up-graded to 2-year certificate course in textile technology, which was named as District Textile Institute.
 
In 1994 a 3-year Diploma course was introduced in the institution under the Bangladesh Technical Education Board. The duration of the course was extended to 4 years in 2001.
 
The Government of Bangladesh had introduced a 4-year period Bachelor of Science in textile engineering program, affiliated to the University of Chittagong, abolishing the Diploma in Textiles from the 2006–2007 study session. Since the 2012–2013 session, the college is affiliated with Bangladesh University of Textiles.

Academics 
CTEC offers a four-year bachelor's degree program in textile engineering. It is one of the seven textile engineering colleges run by Bangladesh University of Textiles.

 Faculty of Fashion Design and Apparel Engineering:
 Department of Apparel Engineering
 Faculty of Textile Chemical Engineering:
 Department of Wet Process Engineering
 Faculty of Textile Engineering:
 Department of Fabric Engineering
 Department of Yarn Engineering

Number of seats 
The number of seats for 4-year bachelor's degree in Textile Engineering Programmes is given below:

Admission
Admission into the college is competitive and needs a high academic attainment at the primary and secondary school levels. Selection of the student for admission is made through an admission test.

Almost sixty percent of the total students get stipend on the basis of merit during their academic years.

Facilities
There are two hostels for male students and there is a hostel for female students.

The medical services include a medical center with one full-time doctor and a medical assistant. The students are examined free of cost.

The college library has a collection of technical and non-technical books. Library access is open to teachers, students and staff.
 
There is a co-ordination teacher for each year who looks after the students affairs.

Buildings
Practical sheds, workshops and laboratories of the college are:
 Yarn Manufacturing Laboratory: provides practical knowledge regarding the blow room section, carding machine, combing machine, ring frame, roving frame, automatic yearn texturing m/c (Reyter).
 Fabric Manufacturing Laboratory
 Weaving Laboratory: has the facility to weave cotton, synthetic and jute fabrics including tappet, dobby and jacquard loom, hand-operated loom, ordinary power loom, automatic power loom and modern loom with CAD system. Modern looms include air-jet & rapier loom.
 Knitting Laboratory: is equipped with Weft and Warp knitting machinery. Weft knitting machines include circular (single jersey, double jersey, rib, jacquard) flat knitting machine & V-bed machine.
 Wet Processing Laboratory: is equipped with sample dyeing, sample printing and washing machine, gas singeing machine, thermosol machine, jigger dyeing machine, hydro extractor machine, screen printing machine, screen preparation unit, squeezer machine, data color machine.
 Garments Manufacturing Laboratory:equipped with cutting, sewing and finishing machinery.
 Fashion and Design Laboratory
 Testing and Quality Control Laboratory: has equipment needed to test the fiber, fabric, color fastness, and garments
 Computer Laboratory
 Physics Laboratory
 Chemistry Laboratory
 Engineering Workshop
 Jute Lab: equipped with OD batch mixer, Breaker Card, Finisher Card, Drawing( 1–4), Spinning frame, winding machine for jute and machines needed for jute processing from fiber to sacks.

References

External links 
 
 
 

Textile schools in Bangladesh
Technological institutes of Bangladesh
Engineering universities and colleges in Bangladesh
1911 establishments in India
Colleges in Chittagong
Colleges affiliated to Bangladesh University of Textiles